The Parliamentary Under-Secretary of State (Minister for Tech and the Digital Economy) is a junior position in the Department for Science, Innovation and Technology in the British government. It was most recently held by Damian Collins MP who took the office in July 2022 after Chris Philp resigned.

The role was created out of the Minister of State for Digital and Culture at the Department for Digital, Culture, Media and Sport.

Responsibilities 
The minister has responsibility of the following policy areas:

Digital Strategy (including Digital Regulation and Digital Markets)
Tech Policy
Office for AI
Online Harms
Online advertising
International strategy
Digital Standards
Economic security
Gambling and Lotteries
Overall legislation and SIs

List of officeholders 

 Chris Philp (2021–2022)
 Damian Collins (2022)
 Paul Scully (2022–present)

References 

Digital Infrastructure
Ministerial offices in the United Kingdom
Department for Digital, Culture, Media and Sport
2019 establishments in the United Kingdom